St George's Roman Catholic church is located in the centre of the city of York, England, on George Street in the Diocese of Middlesbrough. The Church was designed by Joseph Hansom and was the first pro-Cathedral of the Diocese of Beverley.

History
The church takes its title from the medieval church of St George at Beanhills which was suppressed in 1547. The churchyard may still be seen opposite the present Catholic church and is the supposed burial place of Dick Turpin, the notorious 18th-century highwayman.

A building fund of £1,200 had been raised to build a new church in York. This was to replace a brick chapel that was situated in Little Blake Street (now Duncombe Place). St George's was chiefly built to serve the immigrant Irish Catholic population of Walmgate. Opened in September 1850, it served as the pro-Cathedral of the Diocese of Beverley until St Wilfrid's opened in 1864.

Architecture
The church was designed by Joseph Hansom and his brother, Charles Francis Hansom in the Early Decorated style. The foundation stone was laid on 25 October 1849 and the building completed the following September. Joseph Hansom also designed the presbytery in 1848.

The altar is of Caen stone and was moved forward from its original position in 1972. Another notable feature is the Rood Screen, a fine wood carving of Flemish work now positioned over the sacristy door. The East Window is based upon a Pugin design and the memorial windows of the Lady Chapel were made & decorated by the Barrett family, and financed by the Palmes family of Naburn, the Dolmans of Pocklington and the Coxes of Herefordshire.

Interior decoration

Reredos
Altar
Lady Chapel
Stations of the Cross

Current Parish Priests
 Very Rev Canon Jeremiah Twomey Parish Priest

Previous Parish Priests

Rev Fr. Patrick Hartnett
Rev Fr. Timothy Bywater
Rev Fr. Austin O'Neal
Very Rev. Canon Alan Sheridan

Organ
The organ was restored in 2004 and is the oldest in the city of York.

Schools
Associated with the church were Primary (mixed) & Secondary (boys) schools. The Primary school was established in 1852 and relocated in 1977 to Fishergate whilst the Secondary school closed in 1985. Both were located in Margaret Street.

References

External links

Official Site
St George's RC School
St George's Primary & Secondary Schools Ex-Pupils
Roman Catholic Diocese of Middlesbrough
Joseph Hansom

Roman Catholic churches in York